National Co+op Grocers (NCG) is a business services cooperative for retail cooperative grocery stores located throughout the United States.  NCG offers franchise-like services to food co-ops that help businesses optimize operational and marketing resources, offering coordinated branding; access to loans through a partnership with Capital Impact Partners; and bulk buying rates through the United Natural Foods (UNFI).

NCG's headquarters are located in Saint Paul, Minnesota, home to a number of Food Cooperatives, such as Wedge Community Co-op, as well as the historic Minnesota Food Cooperative Wars.

, NCG represents 148 independent food cooperatives operating more than 200 stores in 38 states with combined annual sales of over $2.4 billion and over 1.3 million consumer owners.

See also
 List of food cooperatives

References

External links

Consumer-Facing Website

Companies based in Saint Paul, Minnesota
Food cooperatives in the United States
Cooperative federations